The Central District of Shahreza County is a district (bakhsh) in Shahreza County, Isfahan Province, Iran. At the 2006 census, its population was 139,702, in 38,929 families.  The District has two cities: Shahreza and Manzariyeh. The District has four rural districts (dehestan): Dasht Rural District, Esfarjan Rural District, Kahruyeh Rural District, and Manzariyeh Rural District.

References 

Shahreza County
Districts of Isfahan Province